Satta Massagana is a roots reggae album released by The Abyssinians officially in 1976.  It is widely considered The Abyssinians' crowning achievement and a classic roots reggae album.

The title track "Satta Massagana" was a huge hit and has been covered numerous times by both The Abyssinians and other artists since.  It has even been adopted by some Rastafarian groups as a hymn used during services. The song, which translates from the Amharic language "አመሰገነ" as "He Gave Praise", was originally recorded for Studio One in 1969, but the label's owner, Clement "Coxsone" Dodd declined to release it.

Release history
The Abyssinians debut album has had a very complex release history.   The first unofficial editions, very limited in quantity, were released by Clive Hunt in 1975.  The first official release occurred in Jamaica in 1976 on Pentrate Label, issued by Clive Hunt and Geoffrey Chung, and shortly after in the United States on Jam Sounds.

The following years, 1977 and 1978, saw the album released by three labels under the title Forward On To Zion.  The album was released in the United Kingdom on the UK Klik Chart Sounds and Different labels, as well as on Bernard Collins' own Clinch label.  Similarly, Clive Hunt's US-based Azul label released the album under the title Satta.  A note on track-listings: the Klik & Different releases reverted to the original track listing of the limited pre-release editions which placed the title track as the final track, furthermore, the Azul edition renamed some tracks and did not include "African Race".

The album would see numerous re-releases over the next decade, including in 1988 by Clinch and in 1989 by the Blue Moon label.

In 1993 the album was released on compact disc for the first time by Heartbeat Records.  This edition included four previously unreleased bonus tracks.  And once again in 2007 as a deluxe edition which included four additional bonus tracks.

The title track off the album 'Satta Massagana' was covered by Ethiopian dub outfit Dub Colossus in 2011 and released on Real World Records.

The title phrase is name-checked by Joe Strummer near the outset of the 1979 song 'Jimmy Jazz' by The Clash ("Satta Massagana for Jimmy Dread"...).

Track listing

Original release

Side one
"Declaration of Rights" (B. Collins) – 3:28
"Good Lord" (D. Manning, M. Planno) – 3:25
"Forward On To Zion" (B. Collins) – 3:46
"Know Jah Today" (B. Collins) – 2:56
"Abendigo" (L. Manning) – 3:33

Side two
"Y Mas Gan" (L. Manning) – 3:49
"Black Man's Strain" (B. Collins) – 2:45
"Satta A Masagana" (B. Collins, D. Manning, L. Manning) – 3:29
"I And I" (L. Manning) – 3:34
"African Race" (D. Manning) – 2:53

1993 Heartbeat re-issue
"Declaration of Rights" (B. Collins) – 3:28
"The Good Lord" (D. Manning, M. Planno) – 3:25
"Forward Unto Zion" (B. Collins) – 3:46
"Know Jah Today" (B. Collins) – 2:56
"Abendigo" (L. Manning) – 3:33
"Y Mas Gan" (L. Manning) – 3:49
"Black Man's Strain" (B. Collins) – 2:45
"Satta Massagana" (B. Collins, D. Manning, L. Manning) – 3:29
"I And I" (L. Manning) – 3:34
"African Race" (D. Manning) – 2:53
"Leggo Beast" (B. Collins) – 3:10
"Peculiar Number" (D. Manning) – 4:00
"Reason Time" (L. Manning) – 2:55
"There Is No End" (L. Manning) – 3:22

2007 Heartbeat deluxe edition bonus tracks 
"Jerusalem" (D. Manning) – 2:17
"Leggo Beast Dub" (B. Collins) – 2:58
"Abendigo (Extended Mix)" (L. Manning) – 5:57
"Poor Jason Whyte (Extended Mix)" (D. Manning) – 4:18

Personnel
Bernard Collins, Donald Manning, Lynford Manning - vocals
Mikey "Boo" Richards, Leroy "Horsemouth" Wallace, Sly Dunbar - drums
Val Douglas, Robbie Shakespeare - bass
Mikey Chung, Earl "Chinna" Smith - guitar
Geoffrey Chung, Clive Hunt, Tyrone Downie - keyboards
Clive Hunt, Jerome Francique, Llewellyn Chang - French horn
Clive Hunt - flute
Technical
Bruce Davidson - engineer
The Abyssinians & Clive Hunt - producer

References

1976 debut albums
The Abyssinians albums